Fotino or Foteino may refer to:

People
 Dionisie Fotino (1769–1821), a Wallachian historian
 Mihai Fotino (1930–2014), a Romanian actor

Places
 Foteino, Arta, a village in Greece
 Foteino, a settlement in the Ioannina regional unit, Greece
 Foteino, a settlement in the Trikala regional unit, Greece

Other uses
 Fotino, a Space tether mission

See also
 Photinus (name)
 Photino, a hypothetical subatomic particle